Paul Joseph Salomon Benacerraf (born 26 March 1931) is a French-born American philosopher working in the field of the philosophy of mathematics who taught at Princeton University his entire career, from 1960 until his retirement in 2007.  He was appointed Stuart Professor of Philosophy in 1974, and retired as the James S. McDonnell Distinguished University Professor of Philosophy.

Life and career
Benacerraf was born in Paris to Moroccan Jewish parents. In 1939 the family moved to Caracas and then to New York City.

When the family returned to Caracas, Benacerraf remained in the United States, boarding at the Peddie School in Hightstown, New Jersey. He attended Princeton University for both his undergraduate and graduate studies.

He was elected a fellow of the American Academy of Arts and Sciences in 1998.

His brother was the Venezuelan Nobel Prize-winning immunologist Baruj Benacerraf.

Philosophical work

Benacerraf is perhaps best known for his two papers "What Numbers Could Not Be" (1965) and "Mathematical Truth" (1973), and for his anthology on the philosophy of mathematics, co-edited with Hilary Putnam.

In "What Numbers Could Not Be" (1965), Benacerraf argues against a Platonist view of mathematics, and for structuralism, on the ground that what is important about numbers is the abstract structures they represent rather than the objects that number words ostensibly refer to.  In particular, this argument is based on the point that Ernst Zermelo and John von Neumann give distinct, and completely adequate, identifications of natural numbers with sets (see Zermelo ordinals and von Neumann ordinals). This argument is called Benacerraf's identification problem.

In "Mathematical Truth" (1973), he argues that no interpretation of mathematics offers a satisfactory package of epistemology and semantics; it is possible to explain mathematical truth in a way that is consistent with our syntactico-semantical treatment of truth in non-mathematical language, and it is possible to explain our knowledge of mathematics in terms consistent with a causal account of epistemology, but it is in general not possible to accomplish both of these objectives simultaneously (this argument is called Benacerraf's epistemological problem). He argues for this on the grounds that an adequate account of truth in mathematics implies the existence of abstract mathematical objects, but that such objects are epistemologically inaccessible because they are causally inert and beyond the reach of sense perception. On the other hand, an adequate epistemology of mathematics, say one that ties truth-conditions to proof in some way, precludes understanding how and why the truth-conditions have any bearing on truth.

Sexual harassment allegation 
Elisabeth Lloyd has alleged that while she was a PhD student at Princeton, Benacerraf "petted and touched" her every day. She said, "It was just an extra price I had to pay, that the men did not have to pay, in order to get my Ph.D." Benacerraf has denied the allegations, stating in an email to The Chronicle that he was "genuinely puzzled" by the accusations and does not know what prompted them. "I am not the sort of person that she describes in her interview", he said. "Yet I do not doubt her sincerity or the depth of the feelings that she reports", he added.

Publications 
Benacerraf, Paul (1960) Logicism, Some Considerations, Princeton, Ph.D. Dissertation, University Microfilms.
———— (1965) "What Numbers Could Not Be", The Philosophical Review, 74:47–73.
———— (1967) "God, the Devil, and Gödel", The Monist, 51: 9–33.
———— (1973) "Mathematical Truth", The Journal of Philosophy, 70: 661–679.
———— (1981) "Frege: The Last Logicist", The Foundations of Analytic Philosophy, Midwest Studies in Philosophy, 6: 17–35.
———— (1985) "Skolem and the Skeptic", Proceedings of the Aristotelian Society, Supplementary Volume 56: 85–115.
———— and Putnam, Hilary (eds.) (1983) Philosophy of Mathematics : Selected Readings 2nd edition, Cambridge University Press: New York.
———— (1996) "Recantation or Any old ω-sequence would do after all", Philosophia Mathematica, 4: 184–189.
———— (1996) What Mathematical Truth Could Not Be – I, in Benacerraf and His Critics, A. Morton and S. P. Stich, eds., Blackwell's, Oxford and Cambridge, pp 9–59.
———— (1999) What Mathematical Truth Could Not Be – II, in Sets and Proofs, S. B. Cooper and J. K. Truss, eds., Cambridge University Press, pp. 27–51.

See also
American philosophy
List of American philosophers

References

Further reading

Books about Benacerraf 
 Zimmermann, Manfred (1995) Wahrheit und Wissen in der Mathematik. Das Benacerrafsche Dilemma, 1. Auflage, Transparent Verlag, Berlin.
 Gupta, Anoop K. (2002) Benacerraf's Dilemma and Natural Realism for Mathematics. Ph.D. Dissertation, Ottawa University.

Papers about Benacerraf 
 Hilton, P. "What 'What Numbers Could Not Be', by Paul Benacerraf', is."
 
 
 Lucas, J. R. (1968) "Satan stultified: a rejoinder to Paul Benacerraf", The Monist, vol.52, No.1, pp. 145–158.

Articles on Benacerraf 
 "Benacerraf Interview" by The Dualist and the Stanford Philosophy Department
 "Whatever I am now, it happened here" by Caroline Moseley

External links
 Paul Benacerraf's homepage at Princeton
 The Benacerraf epistemological problem, Internet Encyclopedia of Philosophy

1931 births
American Mizrahi Jews
20th-century Sephardi Jews
21st-century Sephardi Jews
20th-century American philosophers
21st-century American philosophers
American people of Moroccan-Jewish descent
American logicians
Analytic philosophers
Fellows of the American Academy of Arts and Sciences
Jewish philosophers
Living people
Mathematical logicians
Metaphysicians
French expatriates in Venezuela
Peddie School alumni
Philosophers of mathematics
Princeton University faculty
Structuralism (philosophy of mathematics)
Writers from Paris
American metaphysics writers
French male writers
French emigrants to the United States